Sorted is a 2000 British thriller film directed by Alexander Jovy and starring Matthew Rhys, Sienna Guillory, Fay Masterson, and Tim Curry.

Plot
Carl has travelled to London to clear up the details of his brother's death. He finds that there is another side to his brother's life. A group of all-night rave junkies accept him into their family, as the brother of their late friend. Carl is then drawn into their world in order to discover the truth about his brother's suspicious death.

Cast
 Matthew Rhys as Carl
 Sienna Guillory as Sunny
 Fay Masterson as Tiffany
 Tim Curry as Damian
 Jason Donovan as Martin
 Ben Moor as Thames Barrier Officer
 Kelly Brook as Sarah
 Colin McFarlane as Doctor
 Gina Murray as Jo

Reception
Empire magazine gave the film three stars, calling it "...stylishly filmed, solidly plotted and, in Rhys and Guillory, offers an appealing central couple. All of which, coupled with a refreshing lack of reliance on gangster stereotypes and firearms, makes this one of the more palatable British thrillers of late".

The BBC also gives the film three stars but warns, “Jovy is so keen on giving us a snapshot of club culture (which comes across as startlingly real) that he lets go of his well-wounded plot and so the mid-section becomes a long flat stretch, punctured only by a few entertaining bits and bobs."

Music
The film's modern musical soundtrack includes songs by; Leftfield, Morcheeba, Public Enemy, Elvis Presley, Matt Darey, Southsugar, The Turtles, Mauro Picotto, Paul Johnson, Aphrodite, Agnelli & Nelson, Funky G, Gibson Brothers, St. Etienne, Kadda Cherif Hadria, Disposable Disco Dubs, Six Degrees, Da Hool, Highgate, Art Of Trance, Scott 4, Depeche Mode, Twisted Pair, Lost Tribe and CRW.

During the closing titles sequence of the film, a trance remix of Ithaka's 1992 vocal-poem song "So Get Up" was shown (remixed by Italian DJs, Atlantis) ending the entire film with Ithaka Darin Pappas' acapella line, "I'll See You In The Next Life".

References

External links

2000 films
Films set in London
2000 thriller films
British independent films
Films shot at Elstree Film Studios
2000s English-language films
2000 independent films
British thriller films
2000s British films